Shirani, or Sherani, may refer to:
 Shirani (Pashtun tribe), a Pashtun tribe of Afghanistan and Pakistan
 Shirani (Baloch tribe), a Baloch tribe of Iran
 Sherani, a subsection of the Marri, a Baloch tribe of Pakistan
 Sherani District, in Balochistan, Pakistan
 Shirani, Salmas, a village in Iran
 Shirani, Sardasht, a village in Iran

People with the name 
 Akhtar Sheerani (1905–1948), Urdu-language poet
 Hafiz Mehmood Khan Shirani (1880-1946), Indian scholar
 Sain Kamal Khan Sherani (1924–2010), Pakistani politician and leader of the Pakhtunkhwa Milli Awami Party
 Maulana Muhammad Khan Sherani (born 1938), Pakistani politician
 Shirani Bandaranayake (born 1958), former Chief Justice of Sri Lanka

See also 
 Shirane (disambiguation)
 Shiranui (disambiguation)